The Bleriot XL was a two-seat observation sesquiplane designed in France by Louis Bleriot during the early 1910s. Its structure was made of metallic materials.

Specifications

References

Single-engined tractor aircraft
Aircraft first flown in 1913
Rotary-engined aircraft